Dominik Meffert was the defending champion but decided not to participate this year.Grigor Dimitrov won the final against Pablo Andújar 6–2, 4–6, 6–4.

Seeds

Draw

Finals

Top half

Bottom half

References
Main Draw
Qualifying Singles

IPP Trophy - Singles
Geneva Open Challenger